Yayo may refer to:

People
Yayo Guridi, Argentine actor and comedian
Santiago Luis Polanco Rodríguez (born 1961), cocaine dealer
Yayo (illustrator) (born 1961), Colombian-born children's book illustrator and cartoonist
Tony Yayo (born 1978), American rapper and member of the rap group G-Unit
Yayo Aguila (born 1967), Filipina actress

Music
"Yayo" (Eleni Foureira song)
"Yayo" (Lana Del Rey song)
"Yayo" (Snootie Wild song)